Sebha International Airport  is an airport serving Sabha, capital of the Sabha District of Libya.

The airport shares its runway with Sabha Airbase, which has operations on the southwest side of the airport.

Plans 
The airport underwent expansion in the 1970s to make it into an international airport.

A LD600 million contract was signed (20 May 2008) with a joint venture comprising Lebanon's CCC and a new Libyan investment and development company for a new passenger terminal at Sabha Airport. It would have a capacity of 3 million passengers, and, like the new terminals at Tripoli International and Benina International, be designed by Aéroports de Paris Engineering. This development was not completed due to the Libyan Civil War.

In March 2017, it was announced that the airport had reopened to commercial traffic after closing in 2014 due to the continuing civil war.

Airlines and destinations

See also 
 Transport in Libya
 List of airports in Libya
 Sabha Airbase

References

External links 
 

Airports in Libya
Airport